

Tournament bracket
The 2005 NAIA Football Championship Series concluded on December 17, 2005 with the championship game played at Jim Carroll Stadium in Savannah, Tennessee.  In a battle between two unbeaten teams, the game was won by the Carroll Fighting Saints over the Saint Francis Cougars by a score of 27–10.

  * denotes OT.

References

 
NAIA Football National Championship
Carroll Fighting Saints football
Saint Francis Cougars football
December 2005 sports events in the United States
NAIA football